Azar Khvaran (also Romanized as Āz̄ar Khvārān; also known as  Azākhvārān, Azākhvorān, and Azākhwarān) is a village in Jarqavieh Vosta Rural District, Jarqavieh Sofla District, Isfahan County, Isfahan Province, Iran. At the 2006 census, its population was 1,193, in 356 families.

References 

Populated places in Isfahan County